The 1951–52 Cypriot First Division was the 15th season of the Cypriot top-level football league.

Overview
It was contested by 8 teams, and APOEL F.C. won the championship.

League standings

Results

References
Cyprus - List of final tables (RSSSF)

Cypriot First Division seasons
Cypriot First Division, 1951-52
1